The 2022 Virginia Cavaliers baseball team represented the University of Virginia during the 2022 NCAA Division I baseball season. The Cavaliers played their home games at Davenport Field as a members of the Atlantic Coast Conference. They were led by head coach Brian O'Connor, in his 18th season at Virginia.

They finished 39–19 overall, and 17–13 in ACC play, to finish in third place in the Coastal Division. The Cavaliers went 0–2 in pool play and were unable to advance. They received an at-large bid to the NCAA Tournament and were the second seed in the Greenville Regional. They won their first game against third seed Coastal Carolina, but then lost to first seed East Carolina. In their elimination game they lost to Coastal Carolina to end their season.

Background 

The 2021 team's season was highlighted by qualifying for the College World Series for the first time since the 2015 national championship season. In the College World Series, they finished 1–2. Virginia finished the 2021 season with a 36–27 (18–18 ACC) record.

Schedule

Greenville Regional

Rankings

References

External links 
 Virginia Baseball Schedule

Virginia
Virginia Cavaliers baseball seasons
Virginia Cavaliers baseball
Virginia